Kandsar (also known as Kandehsar and Kandeh Sar Maḩalleh-ye Bālā) is a village in Otaqvar Rural District, Otaqvar District, Langarud County, Gilan Province, Iran. At the 2006 census, its population was 140, in 39 families.

References 

Populated places in Langarud County